Manyak (Mänäk) is a rural locality (a village) in Novoburinsky Selsoviet, Krasnokamsky District, Bashkortostan, Russia. The population was 281 as of 2010. There are 5 streets.

Geography 
Manyak is located 64 km southeast of Nikolo-Beryozovka (the district's administrative centre) by road. Mryasovo is the nearest rural locality.

References 

Rural localities in Krasnokamsky District